The 2010 Puskás Cup was the third edition of the Puskás Cup and took place 2 April to 5 April. Ferencvárosi TC were the defending champions. Budapest Honvéd FC won their first title by defeating Panathinaikos F.C. 2–0 in the final.

Participating teams
 Milan (invited)
 Budapest Honvéd (former club of Ferenc Puskás)
 Ferencváros (invited)
 Panathinaikos (former club of Ferenc Puskás)
 Puskás Academy (host)
 Real Madrid (former club of Ferenc Puskás)

Venues
Stadion Sóstói
Felcsút

Results
All times are local (UTC+2).

5th place

3rd place

Final

References

External links
Official website

2010
2009–10 in Spanish football
2009–10 in Hungarian football
2009–10 in Greek football
2009–10 in Italian football